Patresh Rock (‘Skala Patresh’ \ska-'la 'pa-tresh\) is a rock in Clothier Harbour on the northwest coast of Robert Island in the South Shetland Islands, extending 270 m in southeast-northwest direction and 40 m wide.  The area was visited by early 19th century sealers.

The rock is named after the settlement of Patresh in Northern Bulgaria.

Location
British mapping in 1968 and Bulgarian mapping in 2009.

See also
 List of Antarctic and sub-Antarctic islands
 South Shetland Islands

Maps
 Livingston Island to King George Island.  Scale 1:200000.  Admiralty Nautical Chart 1776.  Taunton: UK Hydrographic Office, 1968.
 L.L. Ivanov. Antarctica: Livingston Island and Greenwich, Robert, Snow and Smith Islands. Scale 1:120000 topographic map. Troyan: Manfred Wörner Foundation, 2009.  (Second edition 2010)
Antarctic Digital Database (ADD). Scale 1:250000 topographic map of Antarctica. Scientific Committee on Antarctic Research (SCAR). Since 1993, regularly upgraded and updated.

References
 Patresh Rock. SCAR Composite Antarctic Gazetteer.
 Bulgarian Antarctic Gazetteer. Antarctic Place-names Commission. (details in Bulgarian, basic data in English)

External links
 Patresh Rock. Copernix satellite image

Rock formations of Robert Island
Bulgaria and the Antarctic